Dekkers is a Dutch occupational surname meaning "thatcher's". Notable people with it include:

Ad Dekkers (artist) (1938–1974), Dutch sculptor
Ad Dekkers (cyclist) (born 1953), Dutch racing cyclist
Frank Dekkers (born 1961), Dutch painter
Hans Dekkers (cyclist born 1928) (1928–1984), Dutch racing cyclist
Hans Dekkers (cyclist born 1981) (born 1981), Dutch racing cyclist
Hens Dekkers (1915–1966), Dutch boxer
Hunter Dekkers (born 2001), American football player
Hurnet Dekkers (born 1974), Dutch rower
Jan Dekkers (1919–1997), Dutch painter and sculptor
Joey Dekkers (born 1989), Dutch football midfielder
Kevin Dekkers (born 1980), Sint Maartener footballer
Louk Dekkers (born 1998), Dutch football midfielder
Marijn Dekkers (born 1957),  Dutch-American chemist and executive
Marlies Dekkers (born 1965), Dutch fashion designer
Midas Dekkers (born 1946), Dutch biologist, writer and journalist
Ramon Dekkers (1969–2013), Dutch kickboxer and Muay Thai practitioner
Tin Dekkers (1916–2005), Dutch boxer

See also
Dekker (surname)
Deckers (surname)

References

Dutch-language surnames
Occupational surnames
Surnames of Dutch origin